IOW or iow may refer to:

Language
 Chiwere language, a Siouan language of the United States with ISO 639-3 code iow.
 Initialism of in other words.

Organisations
 InsideOUT Writers, an American prison reform organisation
 Leibniz Institute for Baltic Sea Research

Places
 Isle of Wight, an island in the English channel
 Iowa City Municipal Airport, Iowa, United States